Fire Town was an American garage-rock band formed in the mid-1980s in Madison, Wisconsin, United States, from the remnants of an earlier popular local group, Spooner. Fire Town were signed to a major label and published two albums, In the Heart of the Heart Country and The Good Life. Fire Town separated in 1989 as the members' production commitments grew.

Sharing duties on vocals and lead guitar were Doug Erikson and Phil Davis, Tom LaVarda on bass guitar, and Butch Vig on drums. Vig would later go on to become a notable rock producer; Erikson and Vig would later team up with Fire Town's audio engineer Steve Marker to form the multi-platinum selling Garbage in 1994.

Discography
Studio albums:
 In the Heart of the Heart Country (1987)
 The Good Life (1989)

Singles:
 "Carry the Torch" (1987)
 "Rain On You" (1988)
 "The Good Life" (1989)
 "She Reminds Me of You" (1989)
 "Where the Shadows Fall" (1989)

References

External links
Fire Town discography

Rock music groups from Wisconsin
Jangle pop groups
Musical groups established in 1986
Musical groups disestablished in 1989